European route E 601 is a European B class road in France, connecting the cities Niort and La Rochelle.

Route 
 
 Niort
 E03, E602 La Rochelle

External links 
 UN Economic Commission for Europe: Overall Map of E-road Network (2007)
 International E-road network

Roads in France